The 1963 McNeese State Cowboys football team was an American football team that represented McNeese State College (now known as McNeese State University) as a member of the Gulf States Conference (GSC) during the 1963 NCAA College Division football season. In their seventh year under head coach Les DeVall, the team compiled an overall record of 8–0 with a mark of 5–0 in conference play, and finished as GSC champion.

The Cowboys season finale against Southwestern Louisiana was originally scheduled for November 23 but postponed to November 26 in deference to the assassination of John F. Kennedy which occurred on November 22.

Schedule

References

McNeese State
McNeese Cowboys football seasons
College football undefeated seasons
McNeese State Cowboys football